Penicillium nalgiovense is an anamorph species of the genus Penicillium with lipolytic and proteolytic activity, which was first isolated from ellischau cheese. This species produces dichlorodiaportin, diaportinol, and diaportinic acid Penicillium nalgiovense is used for the maturation of certain fermented salami varieties and ham. In this process it protects the meat from colonization by other molds and bacteria

Further reading

References 

nalgiovense
Fungi described in 1932
Molds used in food production